Alberto Carbonell Gomariz (born 25 January 1993) is a Spanish footballer who plays as a central defender for FC Jove Español San Vicente.

Club career
Born in San Vicente del Raspeig, Valencian Community, Carbonell finished his development with Hércules CF, and made his debut as a senior with the reserves in the regional leagues. In August 2013 he was assigned to FC Jove Español San Vicente, the farm team competing in Tercera División.

On 14 December 2013, Carbonell played his first official game with Hércules' main squad, featuring the full 90 minutes in a 2–0 away win against AD Alcorcón in the Segunda División. He appeared in eight matches during the season, as his team were relegated.

On 13 August 2014, Carbonell terminated his contract with Hércules and moved to Getafe CF B of Segunda División B. He continued to compete in the lower leagues and amateur football in the following years, representing in quick succession Novelda CF, CD Eldense, CD Lealtad, CP Cacereño and Jove Español.

References

External links

1993 births
Living people
People from Alacantí
Sportspeople from the Province of Alicante
Spanish footballers
Footballers from the Valencian Community
Association football defenders
Segunda División players
Segunda División B players
Tercera División players
Hércules CF B players
Hércules CF players
Getafe CF B players
Novelda CF players
CD Eldense footballers
CD Lealtad players
CP Cacereño players